Aldo Bertocco (7 December 1911 – 9 April 1990) was a French racing cyclist. He finished in last place in the 1936 Tour de France.

References

External links
 

1911 births
1990 deaths
Cyclists from the Metropolitan City of Venice
French male cyclists
Italian male cyclists
Italian emigrants to France